Benji Iván Tun Rosales (born January 22, 1994, in Othón P. Blanco, Quintana Roo) is a professional Mexican footballer who currently plays for Yalmakán F.C. on loan from Atlante F.C.

References

1994 births
Living people
Mexican footballers
Association football midfielders
Pioneros de Cancún footballers
Atlante F.C. footballers
Inter Playa del Carmen players
Yalmakán F.C. footballers
Ascenso MX players
Liga Premier de México players
Tercera División de México players
Footballers from Quintana Roo